Lisa Daniels (born 24 March 1985 in Dunedin, New Zealand) is a New Zealand synchronised swimming competitor. She won a bronze team medal with her sister Nina Daniels in the Duet at the 2006 Commonwealth Games.

She also competed at the 2008 Summer Olympics.

References

1985 births
Living people
New Zealand synchronised swimmers
Swimmers from Dunedin
Synchronized swimmers at the 2008 Summer Olympics
Olympic synchronised swimmers of New Zealand
Commonwealth Games bronze medallists for New Zealand
Synchronised swimmers at the 2006 Commonwealth Games
Commonwealth Games medallists in synchronised swimming
20th-century New Zealand women
21st-century New Zealand women
Medallists at the 2006 Commonwealth Games